Lick Branch is a tributary of Huntington Creek in Luzerne County, Pennsylvania, in the United States. The stream is considered by the Pennsylvania Fish and Boat Commission to be Class A Wild Trout Waters for brook trout throughout its entire length. Glacial till, alluvium, and wetlands can be found in its vicinity.

Course

Lick Branch begins in a steep valley in the foothills of North Mountain, just south of Pennsylvania Route 118 in western Ross Township. The stream flows southwest and enters Fairmount Township. In Fairmount Township, it turns south and then south-southeast, reentering Ross Township and its valley deepens. In Ross Township, the stream continues flowing south-southwest for more than a mile, while its valley deepens. It then turns southeast and then south, leaving the valley and reaching its confluence with Huntington Creek.

Tributaries
Lick Branch has no tributaries, named or unnamed.

Hydrology, geography, and geology
The concentration of alkalinity in the waters of Lick Branch is 9 milligrams per liter.

Most of the length of Lick Branch is on Wisconsinan Till. Near the stream's mouth and also a few areas in its middle reaches, there are areas of alluvium. Additionally, there is a wetland in the stream's upper reaches.

Phillips Creek attempted to flow down the valley of Lick Branch prior to the glaciation of the area. However, a mass of till under Pennsylvania Route 118 diverted it to its present course.

Watershed
Both the mouth and the source of the stream are in the United States Geological Survey quadrangle of Sweet Valley. A total of 3 percent of the stream's length is on public land. The remaining 97 percent is in private land that is closed to the public.

History
Lick Branch has had its name since at least 1958, when it was on a map created by the Pennsylvania Fish Commission. The stream was entered into the Geographic Names Information System on August 2, 1979. Its identifier in the Geographic Names Information System is 1179276. The stream was designated as Class A Wild Trout Waters by the Pennsylvania Fish and Boat Commission in 1999.

Biology
Lick Branch is considered by the Pennsylvania Fish and Boat Commission to be Class A Wild Trout Waters for brook trout between its headwaters and its mouth. The stream is one of six direct tributaries of Huntington Creek to be designated as Class A Wild Trout Waters. The others are Mitchler Run, Shingle Run, Arnold Creek, Phillips Creek, and part of Kitchen Creek.

See also
Phillips Creek, next tributary of Huntington Creek going downstream
Arnold Creek (Huntington Creek), next tributary of Huntington Creek going upstream
List of tributaries of Fishing Creek (North Branch Susquehanna River)

References

Rivers of Luzerne County, Pennsylvania
Tributaries of Fishing Creek (North Branch Susquehanna River)
Rivers of Pennsylvania